Lyle Leong (born August 23, 1987) is a former professional gridiron football wide receiver. He played collegiate football for the Texas Tech Red Raiders.

Professional career

Dallas Cowboys

Lyle Leong went undrafted in the 2011 NFL Draft. He was signed by the Dallas Cowboys as an undrafted free agent in 2011.

Saskatchewan Roughriders

Signed with the Saskatchewan Roughriders of the Canadian Football League in February 2013.

Hamilton Tiger-Cats
On May 23, 2013 Leong Jr was traded to the Hamilton Tiger-Cats of the CFL in exchange for Jermaine McElveen.

Coaching career

Levelland High School 
On June 9, 2021 Lyle Leong was named Head Football Coach and Athletic Director of the Levelland Lobos by the Levelland Independent School District Board of Trustees.

References

1987 births
Living people
Sportspeople from Abilene, Texas
Players of American football from Texas
Texas Tech Red Raiders football players
American football wide receivers
Dallas Cowboys players
Saskatchewan Roughriders players